Brye is a village of Wallonia and a district of the municipality of Fleurus, located in the province of Hainaut, arrondissement of Charleroi, Belgium. Its post code is 6222, and telephone zone code is 071.

Brye was its own municipality until the fusion of the Belgian municipalities in 1977, when it merged with Fleurus.

History
On 16 June 1815 Brye and the heights nearby, along with a string of other villages, were occupied by the Prussian army commanded by Gebhard von Blücher and defended against the French Army of the North commanded by Napoleon Bonaparte at the Battle of Ligny. On the heights—the highest point of the whole position—stood the Windmill of Buss which was used by Blücher and his staff as an observation point.It was here at around about 13:00 that Blücher, Wellington and their staffs held their conference. After the centre of the Prussian lines were broken by the French, a Prussians rearguard put up a stout resistance in Brye.

Notes

References

Former municipalities of Hainaut (province)
Battle of Ligny locations